Stephanie Buhmann (born 1977) is a German art critic, art historian, and curator. Born and raised in Hamburg, Germany, she lives in New York City and Lübeck, Germany. Her book series "Studio Conversations" focuses on contemporary female artists from different cities. Each book is in a different city. The concept for the "Studio Conversations" project goes back to 2012 when Buhamann became increasingly disenchanted with the media’s fixation the soaring art market. Buhmann states, "I wanted to counterbalance that trend while supporting my community by creating a permanent record of something private and simple: conversations with artists in their studios about the works on their walls."

Education
Buhmann received her PhD. from the Humboldt Universität of Berlin in 2021. Previously, she attended Moore College of Art and Design, Philadelphia, Pennsylvania and received a B.F.A. and Master in the History of Art, Architecture and Design from Pratt Institute, New York City, in 2002.

Career
Buhmann has conducted over one hundred interviews with contemporary artists, ranging from Nancy Spero to Mark Dion. She has released five books thus far: "New York Studio Conversations; Seventeen Women Talk About Art” (2016), "Berlin Studio Conversations - Twenty Women Talk About Art” (2017), New York Studio Conversations (Part II) (2018), and Rheinland Studio Conversations (2021). All of these were published by The Green Box, Berlin. Artists include Katharina Grosse, Julie Mehretu, Shirin Neshat, Carolee Schneemann, Kiki Smith and more than eighty others. 

Buhmann’s essays and art reviews have been published by a variety of international art magazines and newspapers, including Kunst Bulletin, Sculpture Magazine, The Brooklyn Rail, ARTPulse, Art on Paper, Art Papers, Art Collector, Chelsea Now and Art Lies. She has contributed essays to various monographs, including publications by Hatje Cantz and Birkhäuser, and she is a contributing editor at artcritical. 

In addition to being an art critic and writer, Buhmann has curated many exhibitions, including the Shirley Fiterman Art Center at the Borough of Manhattan Community College, New York, the Macy Art Gallery, Teacher's College, Columbia University and Jason McCoy gallery. Artists she has exhibited include, Lee Krasner, Frederick Kiesler, Thomas Nozkowski, Willy Bo Richardson, Jackson Pollock, and Richard Pousette-Dart. 

Buhmann has organized many panel discussions, including at the Museum of Contemporary Art in Los Angeles; Teacher’s College, Columbia University, New York, and the Shirley Fiterman Art Gallery at the  Borough of Manhattan Community College, New York. 

Her teaching experience includes lectures at the Rhode Island School of Design, Providence, RI; Pratt Institute, New York; Hofstra University, New York; Wave Hill, New York, and the Beaverbrook Art Gallery, New Brunswick, Canada, among others.

Selected works

Books
Rheinland Studio Conversations; Fifteen Women Talk About Art. Berlin: The Green Box, 2021, 
Los Angeles Studio Conversations; Sixteen Women Talk About Art. Berlin: The Green Box, 2019, 
New York Studio Conversations (Part II); Twenty-One Women Talk About Art. Berlin: The Green Box, 2018, 
Berlin Studio Conversations; Twenty Women Talk About Art. Berlin: The Green Box, 2017, 
New York Studio Conversations; Seventeen Women Talk About Art. Berlin: The Green Box, 2016, 
Frederick Kiesler: Galaxies. Berlin: The Green Box, 2022,

Anthologies and monographs
 Christiane Löhr: In Dialogue with Space, in: Christiane Löhr, Berlin: Hatje Cantz, 2020 
 Ulrike Rosenbach; An Interview, Galerie Gisela Clement, Bonn, 2020
 Frederick Kiesler and Jean Arp, in: Frederick Kiesler: Face to Face with the Avant-Garde, Basel: Birkhäuser 2019
 Yun Gee and Li-lan: Art Without Borders, Tina Kim Gallery, Hong-Kong, 2017
 Across the Atlantic; The Friendship of Jean Arp and Frederick Kiesler, in: Hans Arp and the United States, Stiftung Arp, Berlin, 2016
 Nicole Schmölzer: The Independence of Abstraction, Kunstverein Reutlingen, Germany: Modo Verlag, 2013
 Jack Tworkov: Between the Subjective and the Universal, Birmingham, Michigan: David Klein Gallery, 2013
 Jackson Pollock: Signs & Symbols Allover, New York: Jason McCoy Gallery, November 2012
 Charles Pollock: The Chapala Series 1955–1956, New York: Jason McCoy, Inc., 2007

Art reviews
 Behind the Scenes: A Conversation with Mark Dion, Sculpture Magazine, 2016
 Painting For The Experience: Frank Stella at the Whitney Museum, CHELSEA NOW and AM New York, November 18, 2015
 Constantino Nivola, in: Sculpture Magazine, May 2013
 Wilhelm Lehmbruck, in: Sculpture Magazine, December 2012
 Dan Flavin’s Drawings at the Morgan Library, on: Artcritical, June 2012
 Constantin Brâncuși and Richard Serra, in: Sculpture Magazine, December 2011
 The Work of Stephen Mueller (1947–2011), in: The Brooklyn Rail, November 2011
 Betye Saar, in: Sculpture Magazine, October 2011
 Kathleen Kucka's Ultrastructures, New York:  Brenda Taylor Gallery, September 2011
 Franz Xaver Messerschmidt [1736-1783] at Neue Galerie New York, in: Sculpture Magazine, July/August 2011
 Eva Hesse and Sol LeWitt at Craig F. Starr Gallery, in: Brooklyn Rail, May 2011
 Jackson Pollock Family Letters - Book Review, in: The Brooklyn Rail, April 2011
 Malcah Zeldis: A Life Traveled in Painting, in: Chelsea Now, February 10, 2011
 On Becoming an Artist: Isamu Noguchi and His Contemporaries, 1922–1960, in: The Brooklyn Rail, February 2011
 Anselm Kiefer: Next Year in Jerusalem, in: The Brooklyn Rail, December/January 2011
 Julie Mehretu at The Guggenheim, in: The Brooklyn Rail, July/August 2010
 Gerhard Richter at Marian Goodman Gallery, artcritical, January 2010
 Mark Bradford and Kara Walker at Sikkema Jenkins & Co., in: Artcritical.com, October 2009
 Alice Neel at David Zwirner and Zwirner & Wirth, in: Artcritical.com, August 2009
 Nick Cave: Soundsuits, in: Sculpture Magazine, July/August 2009, Vol. 28, No. 6
 Patti Smith: Veil; A glimpse into Smith's work outside of Music, in: Chelsea now, Vol. 3, No. 18, March 27-April 9, 2009
 Alfred Kubin, in: The Brooklyn Rail, December 2008
 David Byrne; Finding the Voice of the Battery Maritime, in: The Villager, Vol. 78 / Number 8, July 23 – 29, 2008
 Olafur Eliasson at MoMA, PS1 and the East River, artcritical, June 2008
 Ursula von Rydingsvard at the Portland Museum of Art, Oregon, in: Art Papers, March/April 2007
 Lee Bontecou, in: The Brooklyn Rail, April 2007
Caspar David Friedrich at the Hamburger Kunsthalle, in: The Brooklyn Rail, February 2007
 Louise Bourgeois, in: The Brooklyn Rail, November 2006
 Dieter Roth; A Retrospective, in: The Brooklyn Rail, April 2004
 In Conversation; An interview with Nancy Spero, in: The Brooklyn Rail, November 2003

Quote

In 2019, when asked by Deanna Sirlin, founder of The Art Section, an online journal of art and cultural commentary, whether her perspective on an artist’s work would change after an interview, Buhmann replied:

References

External links 
 Official website
 Interview of Stephanie Buhmann by Deanna Sirlin, The Art Section, 2019
 Stephanie Buhmann Profile
 The Review Panel: Stephanie Buhmann, Mario Naves and Saul Ostrow with Moderator David Cohen, May 2014
 The Review Panel: Alexandra Anderson-Spivy, Stephanie Buhmann, and Peter Plagens with moderator David Cohen, November 2010

1977 births
Living people
German art historians
German women historians
Feminist art
German women curators